Antiochus of Commagene may refer to:
Antiochus I Theos of Commagene
Antiochus II of Commagene
Antiochus III of Commagene
Antiochus IV of Commagene